The 2009 PBA All-Star Week was the annual all-star weekend of the Philippine Basketball Association (PBA)'s 2008–09 PBA season. This year's all-star game was totally different from the past All-Star games, as this year's event had 3 all-star games in different cities: Victorias, Negros Occidental (April 22), Panabo, Davao del Norte (April 24), and Quezon City (April 26).

Wednesday events

Mick Pennisi won the game's MVP honors.

Friday events

Jared Dillinger won the game's MVP honors.

Sunday Skills Competition
Held prior to the All-Star Game at the Araneta Coliseum on April 26.

Obstacle Challenge

Time in seconds.

Three-point shootout

Slam Dunk competition

Imports division

Locals division
*did not participate due to injury.

Dunk-off

All-star game

David Noel was named as the All-Star MVP.

Rosters

*will not play

*will not play

References

See also
2008–09 PBA season

2009
All-Star Week
Sports in Negros Occidental
Sports in Davao del Norte
Sports in Metro Manila
Philippines men's national basketball team games